The following lists events that happened during 1817 in Chile.

Incumbents
Royal Governor of Chile: Francisco Marcó del Pont (-February 12)

Supreme Director of Chile: Bernardo O'Higgins (February 16-)

Events

January
19 January-13 February - Crossing of the Andes
24 January - Action of Picheuta

February
2 February - Battle of Guardia Vieja
12 February - Battle of Salala
12 February - The Battle of Chacabuco is fought, resulting in a Spanish defeat and the Patriot capture of Santiago.
12 February - Spanish Royal Governor of Chile Francisco Marcó del Pont is captured by Patriot  forces after the Battle of Chacabuco.
16 February - Bernardo O'Higgins is granted dictatorial powers.

April
4 April - Battle of Curapalihue

May
5 May - Battle of Cerro Gavilan

June
1 June - The Legion of Merit of Chile is established by Bernardo O'Higgins to recognize personal merit.
2 June - The Ministry of Finance is established.

October
18 October - The Flag of Chile is adopted.

November
15 November - Chilean independence referendum, 1817
20 November - O'Higgins authorizes privateers to engage as commerce raiders against the Spanish.

December
5-6 December - Battle of Talcahuano

Births
2 February - Salvador Sanfuentes (d. 1860)
13 June - Antonio Varas (d. 1886)
21 July - Francisco Astaburuaga Cienfuegos (d. 1892)_

Deaths
 12 February - Ildefonso Elorreaga (b. 1782)
 17 April - Vicente San Bruno

References 

1810s in the Captaincy General of Chile
Chile
Chile